Donghaean Derby (lit. east sea coast Derby, the Korean local name for Sea of Japan coast Derby) is a oldest and fierce football rivalry between Pohang Steelers and Ulsan Hyundai, two professional football clubs based in Gyeongsang Province in South Korea.Pohang and Ulsan are geographically close east coast ports of Korea.

History 
After both teams settled down in their current cities in the mid-1990s, the rivalry between the two slowly formed.

The rivalry truly started after the 1998 K League Championship, in which the two clubs met in the semifinal. In the first leg, Pohang beat Ulsan 3-2 in a thrilling match in which three goals were scored in the added minutes of the second half. In the second leg, held in the Ulsan Stadium, they were drawing 1-1, which meant Pohang were about to progress to the final, until Ulsan's goalkeeper Kim Byung-Ji scored a last-minute header after a free-kick. The goal made the aggregate score 4-4, and Ulsan eventually became the winner after Kim Byung-Ji saved Pohang's two penalties in the following penalty shoot-out.
In 2001, Kim Byung-Ji, who had been having a series of conflicts with Ulsan because the club did not let him move to Europe, moved directly to Pohan, recording the highest transfer fee in the K League at that time.  His move intensified the tension between two clubs. From then, two clubs met coincidentally in several important matches.
Two clubs met in the 2004 K League Championship semi-final and Pohang progressed to the final with André Luiz Tavares's goal.
Four years later, they met again in the 2008 K League Championship First Round. After a goalless draw, the game continued to penalties, in which Ulsan won by 4-2.

The name Donghaean means East Coast, where Pohang and Ulsan are located.

Venues

Players who have played for both clubs 
  Choi Kang-hee (Pohang: 1983, Ulsan: 1984–1992)
  Chung Jong-son (Pohang: 1985, Ulsan: 1989–1994)
  Cho Keung-yeon (Pohang: 1985–1991, Ulsan: 1992)
  Yoon Deok-yeo (Ulsan: 1986–1991, Pohang: 1992)
  Wang Sun-jae (Pohang: 1987–1988, Ulsan: 1988–1989)
  Kim Byung-ji (Ulsan: 1992–2000, Pohang: 2001–2005)
  Kim Sang-hoon (Ulsan: 1996–2001, Pohang: 2002–2003)
  Lee Kil-yong (Ulsan: 1999–2002, Pohang: 2003–2004)
  Choi Chul-woo (Ulsan: 2000–2001, Pohang: 2002–2003)
  Kwon Jung-hyuk (Ulsan: 2001–2006, Pohang: 2007)
  Woo Sung-yong (Pohang: 2003–2004, Ulsan: 2007–2008)
  Oh Beom-seok (Pohang: 2003–2007, 2020–present Ulsan: 2009–2010)
  Lee Jin-ho (Ulsan: 2003–2011, Pohang: 2010(loan))
  Kim Jin-yong (Ulsan: 2004–2005, Pohang: 2012)
  Kim Jee-Hyuk (Ulsan: 2005–2007, Pohang: 2008–2011)
  Lee Won-Jae (Pohang: 2005–2007, Ulsan: 2009–2010, Pohang: 2010–2012)
  Yang Dong-hyen (Ulsan: 2005–2008, 2014–2015, Pohang: 2016–2017)
  Go Seul-ki (Pohang: 2005–2009, Ulsan: 2010–2012)
  Choi Tae-uk (Pohang: 2006–2007, Ulsan: 2014)
  Lee Jae-won (Ulsan: 2006–2007, 2014, Pohang: 2015–2016)
  Kim Ji-min (Ulsan: 2007, Pohang: 2008)
  Brasília (Ulsan: 2008, Pohang: 2009)
  Almir (Ulsan: 2008–2009, Pohang: 2010)
  No Byung-jun (Pohang: 2008–2013, Ulsan: 2010(loan))
  Seol Ki-hyeon (Pohang: 2010, Ulsan: 2011)
  Lee Gi-dong (Pohang: 2010–2011, Ulsan: 2011)
  Choi Jae-soo (Ulsan: 2010–2012, Pohang: 2015)
  Sin Jin-ho (Pohang: 2011–2015, 2021–present Ulsan: 2019–2021)
  Park Sung-ho (Pohang: 2012–2013, 2015 Ulsan: 2016)
  Yoo Jun-soo (Ulsan: 2014–2018, Pohang: 2019)
  Jung Jae-yong (Ulsan: 2016–2019, Pohang: 2019)
  Shin Hyung-min (Pohang: 2008–2012, Ulsan: 2021–present)
  Kim Seong-ju (Ulsan: 2018, Pohang: 2021–present)

Match reports

League matches

League Cup matches

FA Cup matches

AFC Champions League matches

Korean National Football Championship

Records and statistics 
 As of 20 October 2021
 Penalty shoot-outs results are counted as a drawn match.

All-time results

See also 
 List of association football rivalries
 List of sports rivalries
 Nationalism and sport

References 

Pohang Steelers
Ulsan Hyundai FC
Football rivalries in South Korea